Heritage Christian Academy is an independent, private, non-denominational Christian K–12 school in Fort Collins, Colorado, United States, with grades pre-kindergarten (four years old) through twelfth grade. It was formed by families and educators committed to making available a nonsectarian, Christian education in the Northern Colorado region.

Heritage Christian Academy is accredited by and a member of the Association of Christian Schools International (ACSI).

History

Heritage Christian Academy is an independent, non-denominational Christian school, serving grades Pre-K through 12. The school is incorporated in the state of Colorado as a non-profit organization, under the direction of a nine-member board of directors. Founded in 1970 by three local churches, HCA opened its doors to fifty-six students, four teachers, and one administrator under the name Heritage Christian School. Today, Heritage is supported by the Heritage Christian Foundation, is fully accredited, and has over two hundred students.

Curriculum
HCA uses a curriculum that emphasizes a Christian world and life view. The school employs the Principle Approach teaching method, which places principles found in the Bible, such as the principle of self government, at the center of each subject.

Athletic achievements 
The HCA boys' basketball team won the Mile High League regular season title in 2009 and advanced to the state tournament, where they captured the consolation trophy.

The HCA track and field boys and girls' teams were both represented at State in their very first year (spring 2013), with the boys' team winning first place and the girls' team placing fourth. In the next season (spring 2014) both teams placed high again with the boys' team taking their second championship in a row, and the girls' team taking second. In the spring 2015 season the men's team took a step back, finishing fourth,
but the women's team was able to secure their first championship. At the next State meet (spring 2016) both the men's and women's teams were able to win championships. This past season, at the State Meet, the men finished first with the women's team taking third.

References

External links

Further reading
 
 
 

Christian schools in Colorado
Private high schools in Colorado
Schools in Larimer County, Colorado
Education in Fort Collins, Colorado
Nondenominational Christian schools in the United States
Educational institutions established in 2007
Private middle schools in Colorado
Private elementary schools in Colorado
2007 establishments in Colorado